is an electoral district of the Japanese House of Representatives. The district was established in 2022, and it will elect its first representative in the 2025 general election.

Areas Covered

Current District 
As of 11 January 2023, the areas covered by the district are as follows:

 Nakano
 Suginami (Eastern areas)
 Honan 1 & 2, Izumi 1–4, Eifuku 1, Wada 1–3, Horinouchi 1–3, Matsunoku 1–3, Omiya 1, Omiya 2 (1-4, 19–27), Umezato 1–2, Koenji-Minami 1–5, Koenji-kita 1

Before the creation of the district, Nakano Ward was split between the 7th and 10th districts, and the eastern parts of Suginami Ward were formerly split between the 7th and 8th districts.

Elected Representatives

Election Results

References 

Suginami
Nakano, Tokyo